This is a list of the top-selling singles in New Zealand for 2019 from the Official New Zealand Music Chart's end-of-year chart, compiled by Recorded Music NZ. Recorded Music NZ also published a 2019 list for the top 20 singles released by New Zealand artists.

Chart 
Key
 – Song of New Zealand origin

Top 20 singles of 2019 by New Zealand artists

Notes

References 

2019 in New Zealand music
2019 record charts
Singles 2019